The Lyra Davidica ("the harp of David"; expanded title: Lyra Davidica, or a Collection of Divine Songs and Hymns, Partly New[ly] Composed, Partly Translated from the High-German and Latin Hymns) is a collection of hymns and tunes first published in 1708. The collection was one of many containing hymns translated (mostly) from German, at a time when Anglicanism was heavily influenced by German evangelical pietism.

One well-known hymn from the collection is the Easter hymn "Jesus Christ Is Risen Today", whose melody is the only one which has survived since the original publication in 1708.

Philip Pullman named Lyra Belacqua, the heroine of his trilogy His Dark Materials, after the Lyra Davidica.

References

External links 
 Lyra Davidica at the Internet Archive

1708 books
Anglican hymnals

Anglican liturgical books